Damery may refer to:

Places
Damery, Gloucestershire, England
Damery, Marne, France
Damery, Somme, France

People with the surname
Walther Damery (1610 – after 1672), Flemish Baroque painter

Other uses
Damery (grape), another name for the French wine grape Folle Blanche